The 2019–20 Port Vila Premier League is the 26th season of the Port Vila Premier League, the top football league in Port Vila, the capital of Vanuatu. The season was previously scheduled to begin in 20 September but it was postponed to 12 October due to 2019 OFC Men's Olympic Qualifying Tournament that was held in Fiji between 21 September and 5 October. Tafea are the defending champions. All clubs play home games at the 6,500-capacity Port Vila Municipal Stadium, except for Yatel FC. They play at the 5,000-capacity Korman Stadium.

Teams
A total of eight teams compete in the league. Shepherds United were relegated from last season. Amicale finished their football activities and were removed from the league. They were replaced by promoted teams Sia-Raga and Mauwia.

League table

Results 

1st Round - 12 October 2019 

Galaxy FC 14-0 Yatel
Erakor Golden Star 3-0 Tupuji Imere (WO) 
Tafea 2-0 Sia-Raga 
Ifira Black Bird 2-0 Mauwia 

2nd Round - 18 and 19 October 2019 

Galaxy 10-0 Mauwia
Tupuji Imere 0-4 Sia-Raga
Tafea 3-1 Yatel
Ifira Black Bird 0-0 Erakor Golden Star 

3rd Round - 25 and 26 October 2019

Tafea 3-1 Mauwia 
Tupuji Imere 0-0 Yatel 
Ifira Black Bird 2-0 Sia Raga 
Galaxy 2-2 Erakor Golden Star 

4th Round - 01 and 02 November 2019 

Yatel 1-1 Ifira Black Bird 
Sia-Raga 1-0 Galaxy 
Tupuji Imere 6-1 Mauwia 
Tafea 1-1 Erakor Golden Star 

5h Round - 08 and 09 November 2019 

Sia-Raga 1-1 Yatel 
Ifira Black Bird 4-0 Tupuji Imere 
Erakor Golden Star 2-0 Mauwia 
Galaxy 0-0 Tafea

Top scorers

See also
2019 VFF National Super League
2020 VFF National Super League
2019 Independence Cup
2019 PVFA Cup

References

Vanuatu, Port Vila
Vanuatu, Port Vila
Port Vila Football League seasons
2019–20 in Vanuatuan football